The Old Guard is a series of graphic novels created by Greg Rucka and Leandro Fernández. It has released over 16 novels from three series and a film adaptation from Netflix and Skydance Media with a sequel in the works. It follows a group of immortal soldiers, led by a +6,000-year-old woman named Andromache of Scythia (Andy), who have been around years and formed a group known as The Old Guard.

Background
The series follows a group of soldiers who has given the gift of immortality. Led by Andromache of Scythia, Andy, and her comrades ply their trade for those who can find and afford their services. But in the 21st century, immortality is a hard secret to keep, and when they live long enough, they'll learn that there are many fates worse than death. 

The Old Guard was named after the 3rd U.S. Infantry Regiment who lived since 1784 and inspiration for the team was made from Rucka who wanted the story to be an adventure about invincible characters, but he started to like their immortality better since he compares them to the Looney Tunes cartoons due to how many times you can hurt a character and they'll still keep going. However, immortality played a big part of the series for the characters as Rucka realized that halfway through the process of making the Old Guard, he was using the idea of that in an attempt to rationalize the necessity of death after his father's recent passing.

Novels

The Old Guard: Opening Fire (2017)
The Old Guard is the first chapter of the series to be released with five novels on February 22, 2017 to June 21, 2017. The full version was released on August 30, 2017. It was written by Greg Rucka and illustrated by Leandro Fernández. A Woman's History Month cover was made by Nicola Scott who became part of the third series later on.

The Old Guard: Force Multiplied (2019–20)
The Old Guard: Force Multiplied is the second chapter of the series and was released with five novels on December 18, 2019 to July 15, 2020. The full version was released on September 16, 2020.

The Old Guard: Tales Through Time (2020–21)
The Old Guard: Tales Through Time is the third chapter of the series and was released with six novels on April 21, 2021 to September 22, 2021. The full version was released on December 15, 2021. Unlike the last two chapters, this series was more of an anthology series made by various writers like Brian Michael Bendis, Kelly Sue DeConnick, Matt Fraction, Vita Ayala, Jason Aaron, David F. Walker, and artists like Valentine De Landro, Nicola Scott, Michael Avon Oeming, Rafael Albuquerque, Mike Henderson, Matthew Clark, and Kano.

Characters 
 Andy - a 6,000+ year old woman known as Andromache of Scythia who is the leader of The Old Guard.
 Nile Freeman - a former Marine Corps corporal from Chicago and current member of the Old Guard. 
 Booker - a thief from late 1400s France who was known as Sebastian Le Livre.
 Joe - an artist from North Africa who was known as Yusuf al-Kaysani and is in a relationship with Nicky, whom he met while fighting on opposite sides during the Crusades.
 Nicky - a Catholic priest from Italy who was known as Nicolò di Genoa and is in a relationship with Joe, whom he met while fighting on opposite sides during the Crusades.
 Noriko/Quynh - Andy’s former love interest and an immortal who nearly died from being drowned. In the novel series, she was a Japanese  fighter known as Noriko. However, for the film series, her character was changed to Vietnamese with her name now Quynh, portrayed by Veronica Ngô.
 James Copley

Critical reception
The series has received generally positive reviews, with praise for the premise, artwork, and LGBTQ+ representation, but with some criticism for its pacing.

Film adaptations

The Old Guard (2020) 
The Old Guard was released on July 10, 2020, on Netflix and has been receiving generally positive reviews from critics, with praise for the action sequences and Theron's performance.

In March 2017, Skydance Media picked up the rights to adapt the comic The Old Guard into a film with  Rucka's contract stipulated that a major scene highlighting the romance between the characters Joe and Nicky from the comic book must also be in the film adaptation.

In July 2018, they hired Gina Prince-Bythewood to direct with Rucka adapting his comic book to screenplay and Skydance's David Ellison, Dana Goldberg and Don Granger producing. With a budget of about $70 million, Prince-Bythewood became the first black woman to direct a big-budget comic book film. In March 2019, Netflix picked up worldwide rights to the film and agreed to finance it with Skydance. Charlize Theron joined the film and also co-producing with Beth Kono, A.J. Dix, Marc Evans. KiKi Layne was confirmed to star in the film after Netflix picked up the rights.

The Old Guard 2 (TBA) 
It was reported on January 27, 2021 that Netflix had greenlit a sequel. On August 26, it was announced that Victoria Mahoney would replace Prince-Bythewood as director for the sequel. Theron, Layne, Schoenaerts, Kenzari, Marinelli, Ngo, and Ejiofor are to reprise their respective roles from the original movie. In June 2022, Uma Thurman and Henry Golding were cast in undisclosed roles.

References

External links
imagecomics.com

American film series
American graphic novels
Film franchises